t.A.T.u. were a Russian music duo that consisted of Lena Katina and Julia Volkova. The singers were part of children's music group Neposedy before being managed by producer and director Ivan Shapovalov and signing with Russian record label Neformat. t.A.T.u.'s debut album 200 Po Vstrechnoy (2001) was a commercial success in Eastern Europe, and that made the duo sign with Interscope Records to release its English-language counterpart, 200 km/h in the Wrong Lane (2002). The album was certified platinum by the IFPI for one million copies sold in Europe and became the first album by a foreign group to reach number one in Japan. It was also certified gold in the United States and included the international hits "All the Things She Said" and "Not Gonna Get Us". The duo represented Russia in the Eurovision Song Contest 2003 with the song "Ne ver', ne boysia", finishing third.

t.A.T.u. released the albums Dangerous and Moving and Lyudi Invalidy in 2005 to moderate success after parting ways with Shapovalov. The former was promoted with the international hit "All About Us". The duo ventured into other projects, such as creating their own production company T.A. Music and promoting the film inspired by their story, You and I (2008). Their last pair of albums, Vesyolye Ulybki and Waste Management, followed between 2008 and 2009, respectively. t.A.T.u. officially broke up in 2011, with Katina and Volkova pursuing solo careers. They reunited to perform at special occasions, such as the opening ceremony of the 2014 Winter Olympics in Sochi, in subsequent years.

History

1999–2001: Formation and 200 Po Vstrechnoy

Before production of t.A.T.u. began, the pair were in a group named Neposedi. Both Lena Katina and Julia Volkova were part of the band, along with members Sergey Lazarev and Vlad Topalov. Katina was also in a band named "Avenue" between 1994 and 1997. It was reported that Volkova was banned from being in Neposedi, amid claims she was misbehaving and disrupting other members in the group, along with being accused of smoking, swearing and drinking. However, Neposedi denied the claims and said that Volkova aged out of the group.

t.A.T.u. were formed in 1999 by Ivan Shapovalov and his friend/business partner Alexander Voitinskiy, who developed plans to create a musical project in Russia. With this idea in mind, Shapovalov and Voitinskiy organized auditions in Moscow in early 1999 for teenage female vocalists. By the end of auditioning, the partners narrowed their search down to ten girls, including the members that finally became t.A.T.u., Lena Katina and Julia Volkova. Lena and Julia knew each other before the auditions.  Both girls stood out among the others because of their appearance and vocal experience, but the producers decided to start with 14-year-old Katina, who sang "It Must Have Been Love" by Roxette. Katina began recording demos, including "Yugoslavia", a protest song about NATO bombing of Yugoslavia. After the demos were cut, Shapovalov insisted that another girl be added to the project. Thus, in late 1999, 14-year-old Julia Volkova was added to the group to complete the duo. She also started recording not long after Lena's "Yugoslavia" demo was finished.

According to Katina, Shapovalov was inspired to create the duo after the release of the Swedish film Show Me Love which focused on the romance between two school girls. After completing the duo, the producers decided on the name "Тату" (Tatu). Sounding like the English word "tattoo", it is also a shortened version of the Russian phrase "Та  любит ту" (ta lyubit tu), meaning "This [girl] loves that [girl]". For the release of their first English-language album, they decided to go by t.A.T.u., using uppercase letters and periods to distinguish themselves from an already existing Australian band, Tatu.

Over the next year, Katina and Volkova recorded songs with their producers. Voitinskij left the project, and Shapovalov decided to sign Elena Kiper as co-producer and co-writer for their debut album. They also enlisted the help of Trevor Horn to write the English-language version of "Ya Soshla s Uma". Trevor Horn went on to write t.A.T.u.'s most memorable song, "All the Things She Said", and helped produce most of the English album 200 km/h In The Wrong Lane. While working with Shapovalov, the group was "controlled" by him and it was reported that he was "strict" during the process of making the album.

The first single was completed in autumn 2000, titled "Ya Soshla S Uma" (later released in English as "All the Things She Said"). It was not physically and formally released until December 2000. The song describes the turmoil in a girl's soul because she is in love with another girl, but is afraid, as society frowns upon this. She asks her parents for forgiveness. Elena Kiper has been credited with the song, explaining that the idea came to her when she fell asleep at her dentist's office and had a dream in which she kissed another woman. She woke up saying out loud, "Я сошла с ума!" (Ya soshla s uma, meaning "I've lost my mind"). Ivan Shapovalov is said to have added the second phrase of the chorus, "Мне нужна она" (Mne nuzhna ona, meaning "I need her").

Their first album, 200 Po Vstrechnoy was released on 21 May 2001. Their second single was "Nas Ne Dogonyat" which was only released in music video form rather than as an official CD single, although a promotional conjoined "Ya Soshla s Uma/Nas Ne Dagonyat" was released in Poland. This was followed by the third single "30 Minut", only available as a music video. The album was eventually released in Japan, where it was certified gold by RIAJ. The group went on tour in 2001, where their routines were described as "precise" and featured routines where the girls had to strip. The tour appeared in countries including Germany, Bulgaria, Slovakia, the Czech Republic, and Israel.

2002–2003: 200 km/h in the Wrong Lane and Eurovision
The English version of the album was released in December 2002 titled 200 km/h in the Wrong Lane. The first single from the album was "All the Things She Said" which was released in October 2002. The song peaked at the top spot in Australia, Denmark, Germany, Ireland, Italy, Japan, New Zealand, Norway, Switzerland and the United Kingdom. The music video caused controversy worldwide, due to the members, who were both 17 at the time of the video's production, kissing behind a fence. Some believed the video promoted lesbianism and pedophilia. Many musical journalists, publications and music critics had branded the group's music as "paedophilic pop". The group announced their "Show Me Love Tour", which was to commence in the United Kingdom. However, both of their proposed concerts in the UK were cancelled due to poor ticket sales. In July 2002, Blender praised the group by saying "We have seen the future of rock & roll ... to say you've never seen or heard anything quite like it is a colossal understatement." t.A.T.u. were then heralded by The Face magazine as "The hottest popstars in the world right now."
On 25 February 2003 the women mocked NBC's insistence that they neither kiss nor comment on the Iraq war by performing "All the Things She Said" in white "T-shirts that bore the Russian language message Khuy Voyne! (Fuck the war!) across the front, and by blocking their faces with their hands as they kissed during a break in their performance."

The "Fuck the War!" T-shirts were banned on the Jimmy Kimmel Live! show and replaced with T-shirts that said "Censored". They still wrote the term on Jimmy Kimmel's hand.

The next single "Not Gonna Get Us" was released in May 2003. Though not as popular as their debut single, it managed to have success in most record charts. Also in May 2003, Shapovalov was arrested after arranging filming for the group's music video "Show Me Love" in Moscow's Red Square despite his application for filming being refused. Shapovalov also attempted to film near London's Big Ben and various other locations. The footage that was recorded was later used for a music video for the song "Show Me Love", despite the song not being released in any country other than Poland. The group then released their third single "30 Minutes". It was released as an official single in the UK. A music video followed after the release. The fourth single off the album "How Soon Is Now?" was a cover of the song by The Smiths.

In May 2003, t.A.T.u. represented Russia at Eurovision Song Contest 2003, where they placed third. After the contest, Russia's Channel One complained that Irish broadcaster RTÉ (Ireland's national television broadcaster) had used a back-up jury, and that it had cost them victory; RTÉ did not use the televoting results after some network problems. A statement by Channel One suggested that there were grounds to believe that the contest results could be much different for Russia. RTÉ responded by publishing the unused results of the Irish televote, which showed that had the jury not been used, Turkey, whose entry was also overlooked by the Irish Jury, would still have won. The group's record label, Universal Music Russia, were originally against the group's participation saying that the Eurovision contest was for "young artists" and said "artists of Tatu's level will not get much out of the participation in it, We [Universal] would much rather prefer the group to work on their new album, and not to participate in contests for rising stars [...]"

The same month, the group postponed their German promo tour due to a late invitation to the 2003 MTV Movie Awards, where they performed. The following month they also cancelled their Riga concert and Japan concert in June, which led to a lawsuit from Pasadena Group Promotion, asking for $180,000 in damages.

2004–2006: Dangerous and Moving and Lyudi Invalidy
On 26 September 2003, the group released a remix compilation, titled Remixes. In November 2003, the CD was released in Russia, with two new tracks and videos. The two new tracks were "Prostiye Dvizheniya" and "Ne Ver, Ne Boisya." Both of the tracks were released as singles, however "Prostye Dvizheniya" did not broadcast well in Russia, due to the promotion for "Ne Ver, Ne Boisya" in the Eurovision Song Contest. The DVD compilation Screaming for More was released on 24 November 2003, featuring music videos and behind-the-scenes. Anatomy of t. A. T. u. aired on Russian television on 12 December 2003. The documentary revealed that the girls were not lesbians and chronicled the group as they took part in Eurovision earlier in the year.

In early 2004, t.A.T.u. legally broke their contract with Ivan Shapovalov and Neformat. In the months before the split, t.A.T.u. and Shapovalov were being filmed for a reality show on STS in Russia titled Podnebesnaya. The show followed the group as they were recording their second album, to little success, with their producer Ivan Shapovalov. The documentary aired on Russian television from January to March 2004.

There were many rumors around the split until the show aired, which depicted the group leaving due to a lack of interest and care from their producer. They also claimed the quality of the music being produced was too low, and that Shapovalov was only interested in creating scandals. Volkova stated, "He [Ivan] spends his time thinking up scandals instead of planning our artistic work. I'm sure our fans would rather hear new songs and new albums than new scandals." Katina then stated, "He made us out to BE lesbians when we were just singing FOR lesbians. We wanted people to understand them and not judge them. That they are as free as anyone else." In one of the final episodes, Volkova mentioned returning to the United States in spring of 2004 to record with new producers. However, she became pregnant soon thereafter, and recording was delayed.

Volkova soon joined Katina and previous producer Sergio Galoyan in the studio. The group was backed by their record label, Universal Music International, in finding adequate songs and production to release a new album. In August 2005, "All About Us" and "Lyudi Invalidy" were announced to be the first singles from the English and Russian albums, respectively. "All About Us" was a worldwide hit, charting in the top ten in the majority of European charts. The group released their second English album on 5 October 2005 titled Dangerous and Moving. Its Russian counterpart was released on 19 October, titled Lyudi Invalidy. The second single was "Friend or Foe". Soon after the video was released, the group's management replaced drummer Roman Ratej with Steve "Boomstick" Wilson, and appointed a new bassist, Domen Vajevec. On 25 March 2006, t.A.T.u. received the award for Best Group at the first edition of the TRL Awards.

On 17 April 2006, t.A.T.u. returned to reality TV in Russia with t.A.T.u. Expedition, which was broadcast on the Russian music channel Muz TV. It chronicled the release of their second album, and the recording of the video for their third single, "Gomenasai", which was released during the airing of the show. The video, as well as the actual song, is quite a departure from t.A.T.u.'s usual style and leaves many of their fans cold. t.A.T.u. performed in Saint Petersburg, Russia on 28 April kicking off their Dangerous and Moving Tour. On 30 August 2006, the official website announced that the girls had left their record company, Universal/Interscope.

On 21 November 2006, the region of the Komi Republic in Russia filed a lawsuit against t.A.T.u. over the album and song "Lyudi Invalidy" due to the title translating to "disabled people". Leonid Vakuev, a human rights representative for the Komi Republic, interpreted the song as being directed towards disabled people and cited words written in the booklet for the album, which said: "[Lyudi Invalidy] do not know what it means to be a human being. They are fakes inside the human form. They do not live, but — function". Katina said, "Of course, we meant moral invalids, people who do not have [a] soul and human feelings." When asked if they had anything against disabled people, she stated that she finds it offensive to refer to people by that term, and added, "We take pictures together and make sure they have priority seats [at concerts]."

In 2006, Russian politician Aleksey Mitrofanov proposed t.A.T.u. to be awarded the Order of Friendship, but the State Duma vetoed his idea. Mitrofanov came to write a novel inspired by the duo, t.A.T.u. Come Back (Russian: ТАТУ КАМ БЭК), which was also adapted into the film You and I.

2007–2010: Vesyolye Ulybki and Waste Management
On 17 May 2007, t.A.T.u. issued a statement directed to their gay fans: "When t.A.T.u.'s second album came out, many of our fans of alternative sexual orientation thought that we lied and betrayed them. This is not true! We’ve never done that and we’ve always advocated love without boundaries." On 26 May, they flew out to Moscow to take part in the Moscow Gay Pride demonstration.

On 12 September 2007, the group released the concert DVD "Truth". It was the group's first release since leaving Universal. In late 2007, "Белый Плащик", "Beliy Plaschik", the lead single from their upcoming Russian-language album, was released. The project was then known as "Управление Отбросами", "Upravleniye Otbrosami", which translates to "Waste Management". The second single, "220" ("Двести Двадцать", Dvesti Dvadtsat'), made its radio premiere in May 2008 and the music video was released on their official YouTube channel on 5 June 2008. "Beliy Plaschik" and "220" were the main attractions on a special release known as "Hyperion-Plate", the first-ever EP from the duo. The EP was released on 8 May 2008 and featured multimedia content including music, video, ringtones and wallpapers.

At the time of the "Hyperion-Plate" release, "Upravleniye Otbrosami / Управление отбросами" was scheduled to hit the stores in June 2008. The EP featured a poster which advertised that date, as well as a coupon redeemable for a discount on the album that expired on 30 June 2008. However, the release schedule abruptly stalled on 5 June 2008, when t.A.T.u.'s manager Boris Renski announced that Julia Volkova was seriously ill. Volkova's illness forced the cancellation of a concert in Santa Clara, CA, and the singer was not seen in public until the wedding of producer Sergey Konov on 5 July 2008. The duo returned to work in late August, when it was reported that t.A.T.u. would be the face of fashion designer Marc Jacobs's fall and winter campaigns in Russia.

On 9 September 2008, a press release appeared on the duo's official website that declared that the forthcoming album would be titled "Веселые Улыбки", "Vesyolye Ulybki" ("Happy Smiles") instead of "Upravleniye Otbrosami" ("Waste Management"). The name change reflected sarcastic comments about the state of the Russian music business made by Volkova and Katina in an interview with Moscow's Time Out Magazine. The press release also provided the track list of the album and an early version of its cover art, but still no confirmed release date was given. On 12 September, the album's third single, "You and I" made its debut on Love Radio. The press release disappeared from the site shortly afterward, only to re-appear on 8 October with a change made to the cover art --- where there was once the face of a smiling astronaut on the original design, a black square now appeared.

On 15 October, t. A. T. u.'s website announced that "Vesyolye Ulybki" would be released on 21 October 2008, beginning with a special event at two Soyuz record stores in Moscow where fans could meet the girls and get their autographs. The album also went on pre-sale at the official t. A. T. u. web shop on 18 October, with a small number of buyers receiving a limited-edition postcard set as a prize. The songs were also made available internationally through the iTunes digital music store. Upon its release, it became apparent that the album essentially had two covers --- the astronaut cover was a slipcase, while the original design used for "Upravleniye Otbrosami" appeared inside. The black square from the press release had been hiding a Mars scene.

On 23 October, t.A.T.u. appeared on Vladimir Polupanov's "The 7 Premieres" to promote their new album. They were also the subjects of an ongoing mini-reality series on the website Russia.ru. On 21 October 2008 "Vesyolye Ulybki" was released internationally on online music stores. On 28 November t.A.T.u were awarded the Legend of MTV at the MTV Russia Music Awards 2008.

In March 2009, a statement was released on the duo's site and MySpace stating that the duo will no longer be a "full-time" project and that Katina and Volkova were working on solo projects. They also mentioned that the third video will be released on 17 April on MTV Russia. The album's single "Snegopady" was eventually released, along with its music video.

The girls performed a special concert at the Eurovision Song Contest 2009 on 10 May. They were also included as an interval act on the 12th at the first semifinals, performing Not Gonna Get Us with the Russian Army Choir.

On 13 July, the group released their single "Snowfalls". The song was released digitally worldwide, along with its music video. The group's second single for the album, "White Robe", was released by Coqueiro Verde Records online and premiered on t.A.T.u's YouTube account. t.A.T.u's official website announced that the video was up for voting on MTV Brazil on 10 November 2009. On 3 December, the "White Robe" video reached the number one position on MTV Brazil. It was announced via Twitter that Coqueiro Verde Records would release the album in Brazil on 25 January 2010. The album was eventually released worldwide digitally, and received favorable reception from critics. The album did not sell very well and was reported to have only sold over 1000 copies in the United States, as of December 2010.

The third single off the album was "Sparks", which was the English version of "220". It was released in Brazil and on t.A.T.u.'s official YouTube account on 13 April 2010. On 31 March 2010, a contest was to be launched in which fans will be able to remix their favorite t.A.T.u songs from the new album. The winning mixes would be included on an upcoming remix album.

Julia made headlines in Russia with an interview where she expressed her opinion on Lena's solo career, "She has the right to [sing t. A. T. u. songs], but it's so stupid, absolutely stupid. If you do a solo career, it means that you do your own work. Her stuff, that she makes, I think, is silly and very soon her career will wither away and disappear." Lena responded to this interview via her YouTube Page, "I saw Julia's interview. Of course I got upset. But I want to tell everybody that I have a completely opposite attitude towards the whole situation, Julia's project included. I believe she's a very talented person and I sincerely hope that she'll be successful in all the things she plans."

In July, Lena made an appearance on a radio station where she was asked about the future of the duo. Lena responded by saying, "Life has changed a lot. Julia and I are working on our projects now. I, for one, will be traveling to Los Angeles this Saturday, where I will keep working on my album. And I'm preparing a big show in San Francisco in September, so now we are not planning to reform t.A.T.u., certainly not in the near future. Now we really want to concentrate only on our own projects." Lena Katina and her full band performed her first live major solo show in San Francisco on 17 September 2010.

2011: Disbandment
At the end of March 2011, t.A.T.u. management released a press release on their official website declaring t.A.T.u. over. Due to conflicts between the two women, and them both wanting to pursue solo careers, the duo was officially announced as disbanded. They finalised the duo's discography with a double remix album for Waste Management. The management thanked fans for their loyalty over the past twelve years of the duo's history.

After the split, the group decided to focus on their solo careers, both musically and in film. In August 2011, Lena revealed her debut solo single "Never Forget" which eventually charted at number one on the US Hot Dance Club Songs for a sole week. Volkova was also working on her studio album and released two singles; "All Because of You" and "Didn't Wanna Do It", but failed to generate interest on the music charts. The following year she confirmed she would be starring in the dark comedy zombie film 9 1/2 Zombies.

2012–2021: Aftermath with Volkova and Katina arguments
On 2 October 2012, Cherrytree Records/Universal Russia announced that they would be issuing a special re-release of t.A.T.u's 200 km/h in the Wrong Lane. The "10th Year Anniversary Gold Edition" featured all new artwork, a never-before-released song from the 2002 sessions, "A Simple Motion", a brand new remix of "All the Things She Said" from producer Fernando Garibay, in addition to newly mastered songs. On 24 October 2012, Cherrytree Records released the official track listing for the album; it was a note addressed to fans handwritten and signed by Julia and Lena themselves. The album was released on 12 November 2012.

On 11 December 2012, Lena and Julia reunited to appear as musical guests on The Voice of Romania. It was their first performance together in three years. The duo t.A.T.u performed "All About Us" and "All the Things She Said" during the show. They also appeared in radio and on another television show before.

After the re-release, the group were interviewed by Bradley Stern on MuuMuse, and was asked about a reunion and relationship together. Volkova stated "We don't keep in touch", while Katina stated "Only when we see each other. We have very different lives in different countries now. We are not in a fight though." As for a reunion, Katina said "I believe that there is always a chance for anything in this life. Maybe…." Volkova stated that, while she is not "ready for it", she said "But this won't stop us from reuniting for joint performances. We’ll see what happens!"

In April 2013, the group announced they would perform one live show at a Russian VIP Club. Lena also stated that "The t.A.T.u. comeback is very possible, we are talking about that right now." After Volkova had her second surgery for her ligaments, she officially confirmed that she and Katina were planning to reunite t.A.T.u. However, soon Volkova told an interviewer that they were not reuniting after all. Katina also stated that her solo career was the number one goal at that time and if t.A.T.u. was going to reunite, it would only be for small things like commercials and concerts.

On 27 September 2013, t.A.T.u. performed a concert in Kyiv, Ukraine. Shortly thereafter they wore their schoolgirls outfits from their first album again for a Snickers Japanese advertisement. Whilst in Japan they also performed "All the Things She Said" live in Tokyo.

The duo performed before the opening ceremony of the 2014 Winter Olympics Opening Ceremony in Sochi, along with piano virtuoso Denis Matsuev and opera soprano Anna Netrebko, who also performed the Olympic anthem.  Media reports expressed confusion at this performance, given that there is a lack of LGBT rights in Russia, especially since the much politicized Russian law banning gay propaganda aimed at minors that is being used to promote family values. The ceremony's director, Konstantin Ernst, said t.A.T.u.'s "Not Gonna Get Us" was chosen because it's one of the few Russian pop songs that international viewers might recognize.

On 17 February 2014, Katina posted a video message on her official YouTube channel stating that she would no longer be working with Julia and that t.A.T.u. was once again no longer a group. However, on 20 February, Volkova posted a video message saying that there is "no big reunion" but t.A.T.u. were having "joint projects". She also criticized Katina's "meaning" behind the video and confirmed that they would be shooting the video for the new single. On 5 March 2014, Volkova posted another video message on her official YouTube channel in response to Katina's video. She stated that despite "reasons of severe trepidation on the part of Lena about [Volkova] and [her] behavior," collaboration between the two was possible, referring to the release of their new single as well as their music video.

On 6 April 2014, the music video to "Love in Every Moment" was released to the Cornetto Ru page on YouTube, in which Katina and Volkova filmed their scenes apart. Towards the end of the video, Volkova is shown interacting with a body double of Katina, with the latter's face obscured.  The song is part of the "A Sight of Cupid" project which contains several short films about love. In the short film "Together Apart" the duo were portrayed as cupids. On 22 May 2014, both singers introduced the film at the Cannes Film Festival. Due to their conflict and in keeping with Katina's wishes to not interact with Volkova, both singers had separate interviews with reporters. Volkova announced during an interview with the Italian press that the film would be the last collaborative work between her and Katina. Despite tensions, a petition dubbed "#tATuComeback" was circulated throughout popular social media websites, such as Facebook and Twitter, in the hopes that the former duo would resolve their conflicts and return with their long-awaited comeback as they had originally planned.

On 16 May 2016, the duo met publicly again at the 25th anniversary celebration of the children's musical group Neposedy, which both were a part of before the formation of t.A.T.u. There, together with the children, Lena sang her song "All Around the World" and together with Julia, everybody sang "Nas Ne Dogonyat” ("Not Gonna Get Us").

On 7 August 2016, for the 15th anniversary of "Ya Soshla S Uma" being released, a remix video of "Ya Soshla S Uma" was uploaded to the official YouTube channel. The audio was a remix by Fly_Dream, and the video contained 'rare footage' of "Ya Soshla S Uma" in HD.

In October 2017, the official community of t.A.T.u. in VKontakte received a proposal to create a remix contest for rare a cappella demo, which was intended for the third studio album t.A.T.u. «Waste Management». For 2 months, different authors from around the world sent their works. On 13 August 2018 the video "НАВСЕГДА (Best Remixes) [AUDIO]" was uploaded to the official YouTube channel with 6 remixes: MZ Remix, Fly_Dream Remix, Alexander Davidov Remix, Niko Palonen Щели Remix, Niko Palonen Remix and Niko Palonen Remix instrumental.

On 8 June 2021, a lengthy interview and documentary about t.A.T.u.'s story titled "ТАТУ: 20 лет спустя! Главная российская группа в мире" was published on YouTube on journalist Ksenia Sobchak's channel. The documentary discussed the formation of the group, its past controversies and Katina's and Volkova's personal and career developments after t.A.T.u. It also included interviews of former t.A.T.u. producer Ivan Shapovalov and Lena Katina's mother. Katina and Volkova were interviewed separately, as Katina rejected a common interview. The interview/documentary was the most trending video on Russian YouTube the day after it was published.

2022: t.A.T.u. Reunion

Lena Katina announced that t.A.T.u. would return to the stage in 2022. They had participated in the t.A.T.u. tribute concert which was originally supposed to be in 2021. However, due to persistent issues with the ongoing pandemic, they decided to postpone until spring 2022.

Additionally, Julia Volkova announced on her Instagram account that both she and Lena Katina were to reunite for a special concert in Minsk, in September 2022.

Artistry and controversies

Public image
Throughout their career the group has received criticism, particularly since the release of "All the Things She Said". The AllMusic review for 200 km/h in the Wrong Lane labelled the band as an exceptionally tawdry gimmick. In 2003, after the release of their video of "All the Things She Said", some UK presenters campaigned to ban the video worldwide. Despite subsequent reports that the BBC had banned the video from their pre-watershed programme Top of the Pops, the BBC quickly denied the ban, stating only that they had better footage to show.

Just before the recording of their third studio album Dangerous and Moving, it was announced that Julia was pregnant. This led to critics accusing the girls of being "fake", with regard to the impression they were lesbians, although Lena and Julia have said in the past they are not "together" or "in a relationship".

The group have appeared on Forbes's Top 50 Richest Stars of Russia twice, ranking at number six in 2006 with estimates of 1.4. million dollars and thirty-six in 2007, dropping thirty places. The group received the FHM Special Award for being the Top 100 Sexiest Woman. Both Katina and Volkova have been ranked on Maxim Russia Top 100 Sexiest Girls, with Katina at fifty-three and Volkova at fifteen. The group also appeared on the cover of Maxim.

Cancellations of concerts controversy
Between the years of 2002 and 2004, t.A.T.u. caused controversy for cancelling several concerts and tours around the world. In March 2003, the group announced dates for their "Show Me Love Promo Tour" in the United Kingdom. However the next month, just days before they were due to perform, the group dropped the dates and did not perform at the concert, due to poor ticket sales. BBC News stated that only a fraction of the tickets were sold for the concert and said the stadiums (held in London and Manchester) had capacities of around 10,000. A spokesman from their label, Interscope, did not understand why the cancellation took place.

In May 2003, t.A.T.u.'s management were sued by the promoters EEM Group for the cancellations of the concerts. EEM sued their management for £300,000, claiming they put "unachievable and numerous obstacles" in the way of ticket sales for the shows. They also claimed that Julia's illness was a reason for the cancellation, however due to the lack of evidence, the lawsuit was discarded. After the lawsuit, the group also cancelled their Asian promo tour for Japan and China, due to Julia's sickness, with the excuse that Julia needed urgent surgery. The same month, the group postponed their German Promo tour, due to a late invitation to the 2003 MTV Movie Awards, where they performed. The following month they also cancelled their Riga concert and Japan concert in June, which led to a lawsuit from Pasadena Group Promotion, asking $180,000 in damages, as they did not receive any official letters regarding the cancellation.

While promoting their studio album Dangerous and Moving, the group cancelled their appearances in Chile due to poor ticket sales and the withdrawal of one of the Chilean sponsors. One month later, the group cancelled their tour at the last minute, due to inadequate stage preparation and poor ticket sales. In September 2009, several dates in Russia were cancelled due to the 22 July Tupolev Tu-154 plane crash.

Legacy
"All the Things She Said"  was ranked at number 452 in Blender magazine's "The 500 Greatest Songs Since You Were Born". The song was listed at number 8 on the AOLs Top 100 Pop Songs of the Decade. Rebecca Bary from The New Zealand Herald listed the song at number five on their Top Ten Best Singles of 2003. Bill Lamb from About.com listed the song on his Top 100 Pop Songs of 2003 at number 31 and on his Top 10 Contemporary Girl Group Songs at number ten.

In 2008, the group received the MTV Legend award by MTV Russia. The group is the most successful Russian musical export of all time. Katina stated to Billboard Magazine; "People will remember us for great songs, being free, taking life as it is and not being afraid of anything, [There were] provocative images of two girls kissing each other, but the second thing was the really great music." In 2006, both Lena and Julia were awarded "Woman of the Year" by GQ's Person of the Year Awards, but were not awarded under the band name.

Productions and T.A. Music
When t.A.T.u. was first formed by Shapovalov, Neformat was created as the group's production company, with Shapovalov and Renski at the head. In 2004, the company was dissolved when t.A.T.u. left Shapovalov.

Since 2005, T.A. Music has been the Moscow-based production company of t.A.T.u. The liner notes that accompanied the release of Dangerous and Moving said that the company was composed of t.A.T.u., Boris Renski, Dasha Mischenko, and Andrey Artischev. After t.A.T.u. broke ties with Universal Music in 2006, it was announced in 2008 that T.A. Music would become the duo's record label, although only currently in the Russian market.  Vesyolye Ulybki was released internationally on iTunes through the T.A. Music label. T.A. Music also now acts as the label and management company for Lena Katina's solo project.

Members
 Lena Katina – vocals (1999–2011/2022)
 Julia Volkova – vocals (1999–2011/2022)Backing band members'''
 Sven Martin – keyboards, synthesizer, programming, piano, backing vocals, musical director (2002–2011)
 Troy MacCubbin – guitars, backing vocals (2002–2010)
 Matthew Venslauskas – guitars (2010–2011)
 Roman Ratej – drums (2003–2006)
 Steve "Boomstick" Wilson – drums (2006–2011)
 Domen Vajevec – bass, keyboard (2006–2011)

Discography

 200 Po Vstrechnoy (2001)
 200 km/h in the Wrong Lane (2002)
 Dangerous and Moving (2005)
 Lyudi Invalidy (2005)
 Vesyolye Ulybki (2008)
 Waste Management (2009)

Filmography

Tours
 200 Po Vstrechnoy Tour (2001–2002)
 Show Me Love Tour (2003)
 Dangerous and Moving Tour'' (2005–2007)

See also
 List of all-female bands
 Music of Russia
 Modern Talking, a similar pop duo from Germany which also plays synth-pop and electropop

Notes

References

External links

 

 
English-language singers from Russia
Eurovision Song Contest entrants of 2003
LGBT-themed musical groups
Musical groups established in 1999
Musical groups disestablished in 2011
Musical groups from Moscow
Russian dance groups
Eurovision Song Contest entrants for Russia
Russian girl groups
Russian pop music groups
Synthpop groups
World Music Awards winners
Electronic music duos
Women in electronic music
Female musical duos
Russian musical duos
1999 establishments in Russia
Pop music duos
Winners of the Golden Gramophone Award